Helena of Austria may refer to:

 Helena of Hungary, Duchess of Austria (c. 1155–1199), daughter of Géza II of Hungary and wife of Leopold V, Duke of Austria
 Archduchess Helena of Austria (1543–1574), daughter of Ferdinand I, Holy Roman Emperor and Anna of Bohemia and Hungary
 Archduchess Helena of Austria (1903–1924), daughter of Archduke Peter Ferdinand, Hereditary Duchess of Württemberg